The Baggy's Rehearsal Sessions is a posthumous compilation album by Jimi Hendrix, released on June 25, 2002 by Dagger Records. The album contains recordings from two rehearsal sessions (on December 18 and 19, 1969) for the Band of Gypsys' performances at the Fillmore East on December 31, 1969 and January 1, 1970.

Track listing
All songs were written by Jimi Hendrix, except where noted.

Personnel
Jimi Hendrixguitar, lead vocals, backing vocals on tracks 7, and 9
Buddy Milesdrums, backing vocals, lead vocals on tracks 7, and 9 
Billy Coxbass, backing vocals

References

Compilation albums published posthumously
Jimi Hendrix compilation albums
2002 compilation albums
Dagger Records compilation albums